William Pedersen may refer to:

 William Pedersen (architect) (born 1938), American architect
 William Pedersen (politician) (1883–1970), American-born politician in Saskatchewan, Canada

See also 
 William Peterson (disambiguation)